The 1942 UCLA Bruins football team was an American football team that represented the University of California, Los Angeles during the 1942 college football season.  In their fourth year under head coach Edwin C. Horrell, the Bruins compiled a 7–4 record (6–1 conference), finished in first place in the Pacific Coast Conference, and lost to Georgia in the 1943 Rose Bowl.

Schedule

References

UCLA
UCLA Bruins football seasons
Pac-12 Conference football champion seasons
UCLA Bruins football
UCLA Bruins football